John Lutrell Hooper (born December 22, 1961) is a former American football defensive back. He played for the Miami Dolphins in 1987.

References

1961 births
Living people
People from Brownsville, Tennessee
Players of American football from Tennessee
American football defensive backs
Memphis Tigers football players
Miami Dolphins players